Martín Méndez (born April 6, 1978, in Montevideo, Uruguay) is a Uruguayan Swedish bassist of progressive death metal band Opeth and second longest serving member of the band, behind lead vocalist, songwriter and guitarist Mikael Åkerfeldt.

Méndez has been a member of several other bands, including Fifth to Infinity, Proxima and Vinterkrig. Méndez joined Opeth right before the recording of their third album My Arms, Your Hearse began. However, time conflicts kept him from playing on the album, so the bass lines were recorded by Opeth frontman Mikael Åkerfeldt. Martín then learned the bass parts and played bass for the few subsequent live dates done for the album. His first real recording with Opeth was their fourth studio album, Still Life. He has been with the band ever since.

Méndez uses 4-string fretted & fretless Fender Jazz Bass guitars as well as Sandberg bass guitars for live and studio work.

Discography

With Opeth
Still Life (1999)
Blackwater Park (2001)
Deliverance (2002)
Damnation (2003)
Ghost Reveries (2005)
Watershed (2008)
Heritage (2011)
 Pale Communion (2014)
 Sorceress (2016)
 In Cauda Venenum (2019)

With White Stones
 Kuarahy (2020)
 Dancing Into Oblivion (2021)

References

External links
Opeth.com – Official Opeth homepage

Opeth members
People from Montevideo
Uruguayan bass guitarists
Male bass guitarists
Uruguayan expatriates in Sweden
1978 births
Living people
Progressive metal bass guitarists
21st-century bass guitarists
Uruguayan male guitarists